The Parthian army was the army of the Parthian Empire (247 BC – 224 AD). Having no standing army, the Arsacid king mainly relied on his vassal kings, regional and tribal lords, and garrison commanders. Mercenaries were also sometimes used in the army; however, this was only when the forces of the king were found lacking, or when a vassal refused to cooperate. The leader of the army was the king, his son, or a spahbed (military commander) selected from one of the great houses.

The army was mainly composed of Parthian nobles (azat) and their subjects whom they brought along. The army did thus not endure for long, due to the nobles having to go back to their estates and crops. The Parthian general wanted to finish the expedition as fast as possible and return home. The king himself did not wish the campaign to fare for long, due to stress of a possible rebellion occurring in his realm, which frequently happened and was the biggest defect of the empire.

The Parthian forces mainly consisted of two types of cavalry; the cataphracts, heavy cavalry with man and horse decked in mailed armor, who formed the smaller part of the cavalry. The second and main component of the cavalry were the mounted archers, light cavalry whose mobility and long-range warfare abilities made them a menacing enemy. They used composite bows and were able to shoot at enemies while riding and facing away from them; this technique, known as the Parthian shot, was a highly effective tactic. 

Parthians made less use of infantry, due to their less convenient role on the wide expanses of Mesopotamia, Iran and Central Asia. They were thus small in numbers and mainly used to guard forts. The Parthians also made use of camel riders equipped with long lances, most likely recruited from the western frontier or nomadic allies. The camel was better suited than the horse to bear the weight of the rider and tolerate harsh circumstances. Furthermore, with the camel, the rider was able to unload his arrows from an elevated spot. However, the animal was considerably hindered by the Roman caltrops. The Parthians did not employ war chariots, and limited the use of chariots to carry women accompanying the commanders. The largest number of soldiers that the Parthians are recorded to have mustered were 50,000 against the Roman politician Mark Antony. Each division of the Parthian army had its own standard, which either displayed an image of a dragon, eagle, or the sun. The imperial banner seems to have been the Derafsh Kaviani, the national emblem of Iran.

The successor of the Parthians, the Sasanians, incorporated the Parthian forces into their army.

See also 
 Military of the Sasanian Empire

References

Sources 
 
 
 
 
 .
 
 
 

Ancient warfare
Military history of the Parthian Empire